Yong-pal is a 2015 South Korean drama series starring Joo Won, Kim Tae-hee, Chae Jung-an and Jo Hyun-jae. It aired on SBS from August 5 to October 1, 2015, on Wednesdays and Thursdays at 21:55 for 18 episodes. Originally slated for 16 episodes, due to the high ratings and popularity of the drama, it was extended by two episodes.

This drama reunites Kim Tae-hee and Jo Hyun-jae who first worked together in the 2004 drama Forbidden Love.

Synopsis
Kim Tae Hyun is a talented surgeon. Desperate for money to pay for his sister's medical bills, he adopts the code name Yong-pal and offers his medical skills to those in need of medical attention but who cannot do so publicly, dealing with criminals and corrupt plutocrats. Joining a team of corrupt physicians Kim rescues "sleeping beauty" Han Yeo Jin, a chaebol heiress, from a medically induced coma, leading to unintended consequences.

Cast

Main
Joo Won as Kim Tae-hyun
Jung Yoon-seok as young Tae-hyun
A skilled surgeon, who under the alias Yong-pal moonlights as a mercenary doctor for hire, who falls in love with Yeo-jin.
Kim Tae-hee as Han Yeo-jin
A chaebol heiress placed in a coma by her enemies and get revenge of her, in this who fall in love with Tae-hyun.
Jo Hyun-jae as Han Do-joon
Han Yeo-jin's half-brother, who covets his sister's inheritance.
Chae Jung-an as Lee Chae-young
Han Do-joon's wife.

Supporting
Jung Woong-in as Chief Lee Ho-joon
Stephanie Lee as Cynthia Park
Song Kyung-chul as Doo-chul
Min Jin-Woong as Lee Sang-Chul
Ahn Se-ha as Man-sik
Bae Hae-sun as Nurse Hwang
Im Kang-sung as Cha Sae-hoon
Jo Bok-rae as Park Tae-yong
Cha Soon-bae as Chief Shin
Kim Mi-kyung as Kang Soo-min, Charge nurse, surgery
Oh Na-ra as Charge nurse, intensive care
Park Pal-young as Hospital director
Park Hye-su as Kim So-hyun
Choi Joon-Yong as Tae-hyun's father
Kim Na-woon as Tae-hyun's mother
Nam Myung-ryul as Chae-young's father
Jang Gwang as Chairman Go
Yoo Seung-mok as Detective Lee Hyung-sa
Jo Hwi as Detective Kim
Choi Min as Choi Sung-hoon (guest)

Special appearances
 Lim Hwa-young as Han Song-yi
Kim Jae-young as Yong Pal 2 (ep.18)

Original soundtrack

Part 1

Part 2

Part 3

Part 4

Part 5

Part 6

Part 7

Part 8

Viewership
Since it began airing, Yong-pal recorded steadily increasing viewership ratings, eventually hitting an impressive 20 percent by its sixth episode. It consistently topped other shows in its Wednesday-Thursday timeslot, eventually becoming one of the top-rated Korean drama primetime miniseries of 2015.

Awards and nominations

Remake
There was a talk that the drama Yong-pal which starred Joo Won and Kim Tae-hee could be remade for American audiences. It was reported in December 2015 that a Russian remake produced by Sony Pictures Studios was in development.

References

External links
 

Seoul Broadcasting System television dramas
2015 South Korean television series debuts
2015 South Korean television series endings
Korean-language television shows
Television shows involved in plagiarism controversies
South Korean medical television series
South Korean action television series
South Korean romance television series
Television series by HB Entertainment